Vedat Aksoy (born 20 March 1988) is a Turkish Paralympian archer competing in the Men's recurve bow event.
He is competing at the 2020 Summer Paralympics in the Individual recurve open and Mixed team recurve events.

References

1988 births
Living people
Turkish male archers
Paralympic archers of Turkey
Archers at the 2020 Summer Paralympics